Oleksadr Dubovoy (born 11 March 1976) is a Ukrainian politician that was twice elected the People's Deputy of Ukraine.

Early life 

Oleksandr Dubovoy was born in Kiliya, Odessa region, then part of the Soviet Union.

Career 

 1995-1997 — Deputy Director of the Developer  "Dombudkonstruktsiya" Izmail.
 1997-2002 — Deputy Director for General Affairs of Christian Charitable Foundation "Doverie" in Izmail, Odessa region.
 2002-2004 — Deputy Director for Legal Affairs, "Poliservis" LLC Manufacturing & Trading Company in Odessa.
 2004-2006 — First Deputy Chairman of the Board of CJSC "Ukrainian Investment Group" LLC, Kyiv.
 2006-2007 —President of CJSC "International Investment Group" in Kyiv. The joint-stock company made a significant contribution to the development of small and medium business in Ukraine.
 2007 —President of International Charitable Organization "Foundation of the Good and Love", the main purpose is charitable activities.
 23 November 2007 — 12 December 2012 — Ukrainian MP of the 6th convocation, Committee on Fuel and Energy Complex, Nuclear Policy and Nuclear Safety. Alexandr Dubovoy is an author and co-author of a number of specialized bills.
 12 December 2012 – 27 November 2014 — Ukrainian MP of the 7th  convocation. Chairman of Committee on Legislative Support of Law Enforcement. Chairman of the Subcommittee on Legislation of Administrative Offences, public order protection and public safety.
 7 May 2014 –  Vladimir Nemirovsky accused Dubovoy of organizing the 2014 Odessa clashes. In July, the court ordered Nemirovsky to reject this false report.
 5 March 2015 - Headed Ukrainian "Federation of Karate".

References

External links 

 
 
 
 Kids of Bessarabia remained three months till Disneyland
 Village Council named a street to honor Alexandr Dubovoy

1976 births
Living people
People from Kiliya
Sixth convocation members of the Verkhovna Rada
Seventh convocation members of the Verkhovna Rada
All-Ukrainian Union "Fatherland" politicians
Recipients of the Honorary Diploma of the Cabinet of Ministers of Ukraine